The 1917 Iowa Hawkeyes football team represented the University of Iowa as a member of the Big Ten Conference during the 1917 college football season. Led by second-year head coach Howard Jones, the Hawkeyes compiled an overall record of 3–5 with a mark of 0–2 in conference play, placing in a three-way tie for eighth in the Big Ten. The team played home games at Iowa Field in Iowa City, Iowa.

Schedule

References

Iowa
Iowa Hawkeyes football seasons
Iowa Hawkeyes football